Multiple scattering theory (MST) is the mathematical formalism that is used to describe the propagation of a wave through a collection of scatterers. Examples are acoustical waves traveling through porous media, light scattering from water droplets in a cloud, or x-rays scattering from a crystal. A more recent application is to the propagation of quantum matter waves like electrons or neutrons through a solid.

As pointed out by Jan Korringa, the origin of this theory can be traced back to an 1892 paper by Lord Rayleigh. An important mathematical formulation of the theory was made by Paul Peter Ewald. Korringa and Ewald acknowledged the influence on their work of the 1903 doctoral dissertation of Nikolai Kasterin, portions of which were published in German in the Proceedings of the Royal Academy of Sciences in Amsterdam under the sponsorship of Heike Kamerlingh Onnes. The MST formalism is widely used for electronic structure calculations as well as diffraction theory, and is the subject of many books.

The multiple-scattering approach is the best way to derive one-electron Green's functions. These functions differ from the Green's functions used to treat the many-body problem, but they are the best starting point for calculations of the electronic structure of condensed matter systems that cannot be treated with band theory.

The terms "multiple scattering" and "multiple scattering theory" are often used in other contexts. For example, Molière's theory of the scattering of fast charged particles in matter is described in that way.

Mathematical formulation

The MST equations can be derived with different wave equations, but one of the simplest and most useful ones is the Schrödinger equation for an electron moving in a solid. With the help of density functional theory, this problem can be reduced to the solution of a one-electron equation

where the effective one-electron potential, is a functional of the density of the electrons in the system.

In the Dirac notation, the wave equation can be written as an inhomogeneous equation, where is the kinetic energy operator. A formal solution of the inhomogeneous equation is the sum of the solution of the homogeneous equation with a particular solution of the inhomogeneous equation , where .
This is the Lippmann–Schwinger equation, which can also be written .

Suppose that the potential  is the sum of  non-overlapping potentials, . The physical meaning of this is that it describes the interaction of the electron with a cluster of  atoms having nuclei located at positions . Define an operator  so that  can be written as a sum .
,
so , where  is the scattering matrix for one atom. Iterating this equation leads to 
.

The solution of the Lippmann-Schwinger equation can thus be written as the sum of an incoming wave on any site  and the outgoing wave from that site
.
The site  that we have chosen to focus on can be any of the sites in the cluster. The incoming wave on this site is the incoming wave on the cluster and the outgoing waves from all the other sites
 .
The outgoing wave from the site  is defined as
  .
These last two equations are the fundamental equations of multiple scattering.

To apply this theory to x-ray or neutron diffraction we go back to the Lippmann–Schwinger equation, . A plane wave impinges on a site, and a spherical wave exits it. The outgoing wave from the crystal is determined by the constructive interference of the waves from the sites. Advances to this theory involve the inclusion of higher-order terms in the total scattering matrix , such as. These terms are particularly important in the scattering of charged particles treated by Molière.

Multiple scattering theory of electronic states in solids

In 1947, Korringa pointed out that the multiple scattering equations can be used to calculate stationary states in a crystal for which the number of scatterers  goes to infinity. Setting the incoming wave on the cluster and the outgoing wave from the cluster to zero, he wrote the first multiple scattering as
.
A simple description of this process is that the electrons scatter from one atom to the other ad infinitum.

In this region, the Schrödinger equation becomes , where . The incoming wave on site  can thus be written in the position representation 
,
The Green's function may be expanded in the interstitial region
,
and the outgoing Hankel function can be written
.
This leads to a set of homogeneous simultaneous equations that determines the unknown coefficients 
, 
which is a solution in principle of the multiple scattering equations for stationary states. This theory is very important for studies in condensed matter physics.

Periodic solids, one atom per unit cell 

The calculation of stationary states is simplified considerably for periodic solids in which all of the potentials  are the same, and the nuclear positions  form a periodic array. Bloch's theorem holds for such a system, which means that the solutions of the Schrödinger equation may be written as a Bloch wave .

It is more convenient to deal with a symmetric matrix for the coefficients, and this can be done by defining
. 
These coefficients satisfy the set of linear equations , with the elements of the matrix  being
,

For a Bloch wave the coefficients depend on the site only through a phase factor, and the  satisfy the homogeneous equations 
, 

Walter Kohn and Norman Rostoker derived this same theory using the Kohn variational method. It is called the Korringa–Kohn–Rostoker method (KKR method) for band theory calculations. Ewald derived a mathematically sophisticated summation process that makes it possible to calculate the structure constants, .

In the original derivations of the KKR method, spherically symmetric muffin-tin potentials were used. Such potentials have the advantage that the inverse of the scattering matrix is diagonal in 
,
where  is the scattering phase shift that appears in the partial wave analysis in scattering theory. It is also easier to visualize the waves scattering from one atom to another, and  can be used in many applications. The muffin-tin approximation is adequate for most metals in a close-packed arrangement. It cannot be used for calculating forces between atoms, or for important systems like semiconductors.

Extensions of the theory

It is now known that the KKR method can be used with space-filling non-spherical potentials. It can be extended to treat crystals with any number of atoms in a unit cell. There are versions of the theory that can be used to calculate surface states.

The arguments that lead to a multiple scattering solution for the single-particle orbital  can also be used to formulate a multiple scattering version of the single-particle Green's function  which is a solution of the equation
.
The potential  is the same one from density functional theory that was used in the preceding discussion. With this Green's function and the Korringa–Kohn–Rostoker method, the Korringa–Kohn–Rostoker coherent potential approximation (KKR-CPA) is obtained. The KKR-CPA is used to calculate the electronic states for substitutional solid-solution alloys, for which Bloch's theorem does not hold. The electronic states for an even wider range of condensed matter structures can be found using the locally self-consistent multiple scattering (LSMS) method, which is also based on the single-particle Green's function.

References 

Scattering theory
Quantum mechanics